Zeteny Jano (born 13 March 2005) is an Austrian footballer who plays as a midfielder for Liefering. He was included in The Guardian's "Next Generation" list for 2022.

Career statistics

Club

Notes

References

2005 births
Living people
People from Eisenstadt
Austrian people of Hungarian descent
Austrian footballers
Austria youth international footballers
Association football midfielders
2. Liga (Austria) players
FC Liefering players
FC Red Bull Salzburg players